Ubilla is a town in the province of Baoruco in the Dominican Republic.

Sources 
 – World-Gazetteer.com

Populated places in Baoruco Province